A cannonball, also referred to as a bomb, is a diving style where the diver hugs their knees and attempts to enter the water with their body shaped as much like a sphere as possible. The goal is to create a large splash.

Known in German as the Arschbombe, the cannonball has been turned into the competitive sport of "Splashdiving".

In New Zealand, the dive is referred to colloquially as a Manu in the indigenous Māori language.

Variants
Can opener: a cannonball with one leg extended.
Hammerhead: a cannonball with forward rotation, landing head first.
Watermelon: a cannonball with forward rotation, landing back first.

References

External links
 Cannonball photos at Getty Images
 New Zealand Youtube video of Full-manu with baller

Diving (sport)